Five figure skating events were held at the 2007 Winter Universiade at the Palavela in Turin, Italy.

Medal table

Results

Men
The men's short program took place on January 17, 2007. The free skating took place the next day.

Ladies
The ladies' short program took place on January 19, 2007. The free skating took place the next day.

Pairs
The pairs short program took place on January 18, 2007. The free skating took place the next day.

Ice dancing
The compulsory dance took place on January 17, 2007. The original dance took place on the 18th and the free dance on the 19th. The compulsory dance was the Golden Waltz.

Synchronized
The synchronized short program took place on January 20, 2007. The free skating took place the next day.

External links
 Winter Universiade Torino 2007 - Figure Skating
  (Errors in men's SP)
 Results book

Winter Universiade
2007 Winter Universiade
2007
International figure skating competitions hosted by Italy